Chelford is a civil parish in Cheshire East, England. It contains nine buildings that are recorded in the National Heritage List for England as designated listed buildings.  Of these, three are listed at Grade II*, the middle grade, and the other six are at Grade II.  Apart from the village of Chelford, which is in the western part of the parish, to the west of the railway, and well to the west of the Chelford Roundabout, where the A535 road meets the A537.  The listed buildings are to the south and east of the roundabout.  Most of them are houses and cottages, the other listed buildings being farm buildings, a church and a bridge.

Key

Buildings

See also
Listed buildings in Marthall 
Listed buildings in Nether Alderley
Listed buildings in Siddington
Listed buildings in Lower Withington 
Listed buildings in Snelson

References
Citations

Sources

 

Listed buildings in the Borough of Cheshire East
Lists of listed buildings in Cheshire